Bessières can refer to:

 Bessières, Haute-Garonne
 Jean-Baptiste Bessières, French marshal, duke of Istria (1768-1813)
 his younger brother, Bertrand, Baron Bessieres (1773-1855)